Cylon of Croton was a leading citizen of Croton, who led a revolt against the Pythagoreans, probably around 509 BC.  According to Iamblichus' De Vita Pythagorae, Cylon had previously tried and failed to be accepted into the Pythagorean order (VP 248); however, the clearly pro-Pythagorean bias of Iamblichus' work means we should take this with a grain of salt. In the climactic moment of the revolt, a meeting house was set on fire as the Pythagoreans were debating inside - according, again, to Iamblichus (VP 249). After the success of the rebellion, all debts owed were eliminated and property was seized for redistribution; this arguably resulted in Pythagoras being expelled from Croton.

References

Ancient Crotonians
6th-century BC Greek people
Greek rebels
Ancient rebels